This is a listing of all those that have served as the mayor of the city of São Paulo, Brazil.

1899-1961

The military dictatorship (1964–1985)

The New Republic (1985–present)

See also
 Politics of São Paulo (in Portuguese)
 Mayors in Brazil
 List of mayors of largest cities in Brazil (in Portuguese)
 List of mayors of capitals of Brazil (in Portuguese)

References
 List of Mayors of São Paulo from São Paulo's City Hall's website 

São Paulo
List
Mayors